Members of the New South Wales Legislative Council who served from 1917 to 1920 were appointed for life by the Governor on the advice of the Premier. This list includes members between the election on 24 March 1917 and the election on 20 March 1920. The President was Fred Flowers.

See also
Holman Nationalist ministry

Notes

References

 

Members of New South Wales parliaments by term
20th-century Australian politicians